Jack Pearl Lewis (March 13, 1919 – July 24, 2018) was an American Bible scholar affiliated with the Churches of Christ.  He earned a Ph.D. in New Testament from Harvard University in 1953 and a Ph.D. in Old Testament from Hebrew Union College-Jewish Institute of Religion in 1962. For 50 years, Lewis taught Bible and biblical languages first at Harding University in Searcy, Arkansas, and then at Harding School of Theology in Memphis, Tennessee, where he was named professor emeritus upon his retirement. He authored over 223 articles in scholarly and church publications and published more than twenty-five books. He died in Memphis, Tennessee on July 24, 2018 at the age of 99.

Early life 
Jack P. Lewis was born in March 1919 in Midlothian, Texas, a town thirty miles southwest of Dallas. He was one of four sons and one daughter born to Pearl Gaunce and Anna Elizabeth Holland Lewis. 
After graduation from Midlothian High School in 1936, Lewis entered Abilene Christian College (now University) where he majored in Bible and Greek.  He spent summers selling books and Bibles for the Southwestern Company to put himself through school.  After graduating with a B.A. in 1941, Lewis began preaching in Throckmorton, Texas, and pursued the M.A. degree in English at Sam Houston Teachers College. His thesis dealt with the use of poetry in sermons comparing John Wesley, Alexander Campbell, and N. B. Hardeman.

In September 1944 Lewis entered the Harvard Divinity School where he studied under some of the following scholars at Harvard: Robert Pfeiffer (Old Testament), Edwin Broome (Hebrew), Arthur Darby Nock (History of Religion), Dean Willard Sperry (Preaching and Ministry), Henry Cadbury (New Testament), Harry Wolfson (Judaism), and George LaPiana and George H. Williams (Church History). He earned the Bachelor of Sacred Theology degree in 1947 and immediately began a Ph.D. program in New Testament with Harvard University. He finished his degree in 1953. His dissertation was "An Introduction to the Testaments of the Twelve Patriarchs."

In fall 1950 Lewis began work toward a Ph.D. in Old Testament at Hebrew Union College. His work involved intensive study of Hebrew, and he sat under Sheldon Blank, Elias Epstein, and Samuel Sandmel.
 
In 1954 Lewis moved to Searcy, Arkansas, where he accepted a teaching position with Harding College (now University). After four years teaching in Searcy, he moved to Memphis, Tennessee, where he was a charter faculty member of the Harding Graduate School of Religion (now Harding School of Theology). During his teaching career, Lewis led over 30 tours of Bible lands.

Contributions to Academia 
In April 1964 Lewis published an article on the Council of Jamnia in which he largely discredited the prevalent assumption that the Council of Jamnia decided the Hebrew canon. This article brought him academic recognition. He was invited to serve on the Bible translation committee for the New International Version and to contribute the notes to Hosea and Joel in the NIV Study Bible. He was asked to write several articles on the Council of Jamnia: "Jamnia (Jabneh), Council of," in Anchor Bible Dictionary, "Jamnia after Forty Years," in Hebrew Union College Annual, and "Jamnia Revisited," in The Canon Debate  In 1989 he edited and contributed two chapters to Interpreting 2 Corinthians 5:14-21: An Exercise in Hermeneutics, which was a product of the Hermeneutics Project of the Faith and Order Commission of the World Council of Churches.

Lewis's teaching career included nearly fifty years of teaching a course in History of the English Bible. His book on The English Bible from KJV to NIV is one of the important works on the history of the English Bible. He maintained an interest in this area throughout his career. In 2004 in celebration of the 400th anniversary of the King James Version, at the invitation of the American Bible Society and its Eugene A. Nida Institute for Biblical Scholarship, Lewis presented a paper on the history of the printing of the KJV. This was published in Translation that Openeth the Window. He also published Questions You Have Asked about Bible Translations. Lewis's most recent release, The Day after Domesday: The Making of the Bishops Bible, is a study of the Bishops Bible, least known of the Tudor period Bibles and predecessor to the King James Version. At the age of 93, Jack Lewis published his autobiography, As I Remember It.

Lewis taught a variety of courses in the Old and New Testament and a number of his books grew out of these classes: A Study of the Interpretation of Noah and the Flood in Jewish and Christian Literature (published version of his dissertation at Hebrew Union), Historical Backgrounds to Bible People, Historical Backgrounds of Bible History, a two-volume commentary on The Gospel According to Matthew, The Minor Prophets, Exegesis of Difficult Passages, and Hebrew Wisdom and Poetry.

Lewis read papers at the meetings of the Society of Biblical Literature and the Evangelical Theological Society. He published at least 84 articles in eight different encyclopedias and dictionaries on a wide range of topics: Nelson's Illustrated Bible Dictionary, Theological Wordbook of the Old Testament, Baker's Dictionary of Theology, Wycliffe Bible Encyclopedia, Anchor Bible Dictionary, Baker's Dictionary of Christian Ethics, Zondervan Pictorial Encyclopedia of the Bible, and Encyclopedia of the Stone-Campbell Movement.

Honors and awards 
In 1967-68 Lewis received a fellowship grant from the American Schools of Oriental Research to study as a Thayer Fellow in Jerusalem. He participated in an archaeological excavation at Aran. In 1968, he received the Twentieth Century Christian Education award in recognition of his "scholarly research, profound writing, and inspirational teaching." 
 
In 1983 he was chosen Senior Fellow at the W. F. Albright Institute for Archaeological Research in Jerusalem. He served on the editorial boards of the Restoration Quarterly and Journal of Hebraic Studies. He served as president of the Southern section of the Evangelical Theological Society in 1969-70.

In 1994 Lewis was invited to be the commencement speaker at Hebrew Union College-Jewish Institute of Religion in Cincinnati. At the graduation ceremonies there in 2006, Lewis was awarded a Graduate Medallion as an outstanding alumnus.

In 2011 Heritage Christian University established the annual Jack P. Lewis lectures in his honor.

Selected works 
 Archaeological Backgrounds to Bible People. University Christian Student Center Annual Lectureship, 1969. Grand Rapids: Baker, 1981. .
 Archaeology and the Bible. Way of Life Series. Abilene, TX: Biblical Research, 1975. .
 As I Remember It: An Autobiography. Nashville, TN: Gospel Advocate, 2012. .
 Basic Beliefs. Nashville: 21st Century Christian, 2013. .
 Between the Testaments. Nashville, TN: 21st Century Christian, 2014. .
 Biblical Archaeology: A Supplement. 2 vols. Edited by Eddie Cloer. Truth for Today Commentary. Searcy, AR: Resource Publications, 2015-2016. .
 The Day after Domesday: The Making of the Bishops Bible. Eugene, OR: Wipf & Stock, 2016. .
 Early Explorers of Bible Lands. Abilene, TX: ACU Press, 2013. .
 The English Bible from KJV to NIV: A History and Evaluation. Grand Rapids: Baker, 1981. . 2nd ed., 1991. .
 Ethics of the Prophets. Henderson, TN: Hester Publications, 2001. .
 Exegesis of Difficult Passages. Searcy, AR: Resource Publications, 1988. .
 An Exegesis of Hosea, Joel, and Amos. Edited by Eddie Cloer. Truth for Today Commentary. Searcy, AR: Resource Publications, 2018. .
 The Gospel According to Matthew. 2 vols. The Living Word Commentary. Austin, TX: Sweet, 1976. .
 Historical Backgrounds of Bible History. University Christian Student Center Annual Lectureship, 1969. Grand Rapids: Baker, 1971. .
 Historical Backgrounds to Bible People. Henderson, TN: Hester Publications, 2008. ISBN B003K1SZ5I.
 "Jamnia after Forty Years." Hebrew Union College Annual 70-71 (1999-2000): 233-59.
 "Jamnia (Jabneh), Council of." In Anchor Bible Dictionary, 3:634-37. Edited by David Noel Freedman. New York: Doubleday, 1992. .
 "Jamnia Revisited." In The Canon Debate, 146-62. Edited by Lee Martin McDonald and James A. Sanders. Peabody, MA: Hendrickson, 2002. .
 Major Prophets. Henderson, TN: Hester Publications, 1999. .
 The Minor Prophets. Grand Rapids: Baker, 1966. .
 Questions You've Asked about Bible Translations. Searcy, AR: Resource Publications, 1991. .
 Studies in the Non-Writing Prophets of the Bible. Henderson TN: Hester Publications, 2006. ISBN B0017SSI6C.
 These Things Are Written: Bible Lectures Presented at Harding from 1952-2012. Searcy, AR: Truth for Today World Mission School, 2013. .
 Understanding Genesis. Nashville, TN: Christian Communications, 1987. .
 "Yahweh: The God of Israel." In Restoring the First-century Church in the Twenty-first Century: Essays in the Stone-Campbell Restoration Movement in Honor of Don Haymes, 29-41. Edited by Warren Lewis and Hans Rollmann. Eugene, OR: Wipf & Stock, 2005. .

See also 
 Bishops' Bible
 Council of Jamnia
 Development of the Hebrew Bible canon
 Simple English Bible

Notes

External links 
 "What Do We Mean by Jabneh?"
 "Jamnia after Forty Years"
 "Noah and the Flood in Jewish, Christian, and Muslim Tradition"
 "An Introduction to the Testaments of the Twelve Patriarchs"
 "A Study of the Interpretation of Noah and the Flood in Jewish and Christian Literature"
 Jack P. Lewis Christian Studies Seminar
 Lewis Scholars

1919 births
2018 deaths
Abilene Christian University alumni
American biblical scholars
Harding University faculty
Harvard Divinity School alumni
Hebrew Union College – Jewish Institute of Religion alumni
Sam Houston State University alumni
People from Ellis County, Texas